Akil may refer to:

Geography 
 Akil, Yucatán, a town in  Yucatán, Mexico

Given name 
 Akil N. Awan, British academic
Akil Baddoo (born 1998), American baseball player 
 Akil Blount (born 1994), American football linebacker
 Akil Dhahar, Somalian leader
 Akil Mark Koci, Kosovar Albanian composer 
Akil Mitchell (born 1992), American-Panamanian basketball player for Maccabi Rishon LeZion of the Israeli Premier League
 Akil (dog), Tunisian police dog

Surname
 Ahmad Basri Akil, Malaysian football manager
 Huda Akil (born 1945) is a Syrian–American neuroscientist 
 Mara Brock Akil, American television writer and producer

See also
 Aqil (disambiguation)